Route 513, also known as St. Lewis Highway, is a  east–west highway in southeastern Labrador in the Canadian province of Newfoundland and Labrador. It connects the town of St. Lewis with the Trans-Labrador Highway (Route 510). Route 513 passes through remote wooded terrain for its entire length, with no other major intersections or communities along the entire highway. The road is unpaved.

Route description

Route 513 begins at an intersection with Trans-Labrador Highway (Route 510) along the banks of the Alexis River, just north of that highway's crossing over the river. It heads eastward as an unpaved gravel road through remote wooded terrain for several kilometres to enter the town limits and immediately passes by the former Fox Harbour Air Station. The highway now winds its way through downtown, where it meets a local road leading to St. Lewis (Fox Harbour) Airport (which provides access a trail leading to the now abandoned community of Deepwater Creek). Route 513 curves to the south to pass through neighbourhoods before coming to a dead end along the coastline. At the end of the road, there is a sign stating that this is the easternmost point on the North American mainland that can be driven to.

Major intersections

References

Labrador
513